The 1988–89 Kent Football League season was the 23rd in the history of the Kent Football League, a football competition in England.

The league was won by Hythe Town, who was promoted to the Southern Football League.

League table

The league featured 19 clubs which competed in the previous season, along with one new club:
Chatham Town, relegated from the Southern League

League table

References

External links

1988-89
1988–89 in English football leagues